Djamal is an Arabic masculine given name and a surname. It may refer to:

 Djamel Abdoun (born 1986), Algerian footballer
 Djamal Amrani (born 1935), Algerian poet
 Djamal Mahamat (born 1983), Libyan footballer
 Djamal Mohamed (born 1990), French-born Comorian footballer

See also
 Jamal
 Jamaal
 Gamal
 Džemal

Arabic masculine given names